Cylindrobasidium is a genus of corticioid fungi in the family Physalacriaceae. circumscribed by Swiss mycologist Walter Jülich in 1974, Index Fungorum lists eight species in the genus.

Species
Cylindrobasidium albulum
Cylindrobasidium argenteum
Cylindrobasidium corrugum
Cylindrobasidium eucalypti
Cylindrobasidium evolvens
Cylindrobasidium laeve
Cylindrobasidium parasiticum
Cylindrobasidium torrendii

References

Polyporales genera
Physalacriaceae
Taxa named by Walter Jülich